The Continental A40 engine is a carbureted four-cylinder, horizontally opposed, air-cooled aircraft engine that was developed especially for use in light aircraft by Continental Motors. It was produced between 1931 and 1941.

Design and development

The  A40 was introduced in the depths of the Great Depression. At the time there were a number of small engines available but all suffered from either high cost, complexity, or low reliability. The A-40 addressed all those shortcomings and was instrumental in the production of light aircraft in the difficult economic constraints of the period. The engine later inspired the A-50 and subsequent engines.

The A40 featured single ignition until the A-40-5 version, which introduced dual ignition. All engines in this family have a 5.2:1 compression ratio and were designed to run on fuel with a minimum octane rating of 73.

The entire family of engines had its certification terminated on 1 November 1941. Engines produced before that date are still certified, but none can be produced after that date.

Variants

A40
Single ignition,  at 2550 rpm, dry weight 
A40-2
Single ignition,  at 2550 rpm, dry weight 
A-40-3
Single ignition,  at 2550 rpm, dry weight  Featured cadmium-nickel connecting rod bearings.
A40-4
Single ignition,  at 2575 rpm, dry weight , Steel backed connecting rod inserts
A40-5
Dual ignition,  at 2575 rpm, dry weight

Applications

Aeronca KC
Arup S-2
Heath Parasol LNA-40
Nicholson Junior KN-2
Piper J-3 Cub
Porterfield CP-40 Zephyr
Rose Parakeet
Taylor E-2 Cub
Piper J-2 Cub
Taylorcraft A
Welch OW-5M

Engines on display
Old Rhinebeck Aerodrome

Specifications (A40-5)

See also

References

External links

 E-2 "Cub" Powerplant Instl - Holcomb's Aerodrome. The A-40, as installed in the Taylor E-2 Cub.

Boxer engines
1930s aircraft piston engines
A-40